Luz María Aguilar (born Luz María Aguilar-Torres, 26 March 1935 in Ojinaga, Chihuahua, Mexico) is a Mexican actress from the Golden Age of Mexican cinema.

She has worked as an actress in theatre, cinema and television. One of her main roles was in the series Hogar, dulce hogar for more than eight years.

Filmography

 El secuestro del símbolo sexual (1995)
 Supervivientes de los Andes (1976)
 Las fuerzas vivas (1975)
 Laberinto de pasiones (1975)
 Al fin a solas (1969)
 Dr. Satán y la magia negra (1968)
 Cómo pescar marido (1967)
 Dos meseros majaderos (1966)
 Pistoleros del oeste (1965)
 La maldición de mi raza (1965)
 El mundo de las drogas (1964)
 El norteño (1963)
 Estos años violentos (1962)
 Las recién casadas (1962)
 El caballo blanco (1962)
 La furia del ring (1961)
 Las cosas prohibidas (1961)
 Matrimonios juveniles (1961)
 Mujeres engañadas (1961)
 Ojos tapatios (1961)
 La diligencia de la muerte (1961)
 La llorona (1960)
 ¡Qué bonito amor! (1960)
 Mundo, demonio y carne (1960)
 El último mexicano (1960)
 Vivir del cuento (1960) (as Luz Ma. Aguilar)
 Manicomio(1959) .... Beatriz; Laura, paciente
 Siete pecados (1959) (as Luz Ma. Aguilar)
 Pistolas de oro (1959)
 El águila negra contra los enmascarados de la muerte (1958)
 Mujeres encantadoras (1958)
 El águila negra en la ley de los fuertes (1958)
 Vainilla, bronce y morir (Una mujer más) (1957)
 Juventud desenfrenada (1956) .... Rosa Lara
 Caras nuevas (1956)
 Con quién andan nuestras hijas (1956)
 Soy un golfo (1955)
 Las nenas del 7 (1955)
 Maldita ciudad (1954))

Television 

 Te doy la vida (Mexican TV series) (2020)
 Amores con trampa (2015)
 Como dice el dicho (2012–13) 
 Ni contigo ni sin ti (2011)
 Mujeres asesinas 3 (2010)
 Alma de hierro (2008–2009)
 La fea más bella (2006–2007)
 Rubí (2004)
 Clap...El lugar de tus sueños (2003)
 Navidad sin fin (2001)
 Mujer, casos de la vida real
 Cuento de navidad (1999)
 El niño que vino del mar (1999)
 Vivo por Elena (1998)
 Una luz en el camino (1998)
 Los papás de mis papás (1994)
 Corazón salvaje (1993)
 Aprendiendo a vivir (1984)
 Vamos juntos (1979)
 Hogar, dulce hogar (1974)
 Amaras a tu projimo (1973)
 El profesor particular (1971)
 Cosa juzgada (1970)
 Concierto de almas (1969)
 Cárcel de mujeres (1968)
 La duda (1967)
 Cuna vacía (1967)
 El ídolo (1966)
 Tú eres un extraño (1965)
 La intrusa (1964)
 La sombra del otro (1963)
 El Enemigo (1961)
 María Guadalupe (1960)

References

External links
 

1935 births
Living people
Mexican telenovela actresses
Mexican television actresses
Mexican film actresses
Actresses from Chihuahua (state)
20th-century Mexican actresses
21st-century Mexican actresses
People from Ojinaga, Chihuahua